In-Nazzjon (lit. "The Nation") is a daily newspaper in Malta. It is published by Media.link Communications, a mass media holding company owned by the Nationalist Party. Its sister publication is Il-Mument.

References

External links
 http://www.netnews.com.mt

Newspapers published in Malta
Publications with year of establishment missing
Maltese-language newspapers
Nationalist Party (Malta) publications